A science attaché (also known as a scientific attaché or a technical attaché) is a member of a diplomatic mission, usually an embassy. A science attaché traditionally had three primary functions: advise the ambassador on scientific and technical matters, report on scientific and technological events, and represent his or her country in scientific and technical matters to foreign scientific and technical academies; to industry; to intergovernmental organizations and agencies; and to international non-governmental organizations. A science attaché has also helped forge formal ties between domestic and foreign scientists and researchers, and acted as a catalyst for scientific exchange initiatives. The non-advising roles of the science attaché seem somewhat less important in the age of the internet and the truly international scientific community it has helped create.

The modern trend seems to be to emphasize the advisory role of the science attaché over the facilitation of scientific and technical exchanges. As recently as 1998, the National Academy of Sciences called for the appointment of more science-savvy diplomats to the State Department to improve the quality of the scientific advice available to foreign policymakers. The panel also emphasized the need to encourage general foreign service staff to acquire scientific skills.

While there has been more emphasis on the advisory role, science attachés could still play a role in facilitating exchanges and collaborations by helping scientists from their home country understand the host nation's science culture and practices.

Formerly, being appointed science attaché was viewed as the "kiss of death" for advancement within the foreign service.  However, with the growing importance of scientific issues such as global warming, global infectious diseases, and bioterrorism to foreign policymaking and diplomacy, this perception may be changing.

Historical functions
The role of science attachés of the United States was first outlined in 1950 in a report entitled Science and Foreign Relations, issued by the United States State Department.  It listed the primary duties of science attachés as:
 Reporting on significant scientific and technological developments
 Assistance in the exchange of scientific information
 Assistance in the exchange of scientific persons
 Assistance in the procurement of scientific apparatus, chemicals, and biologicals
 Cooperation with all United States groups abroad having programs with scientific and technological aspects
 General representations of United States science
 Scientific and technical advice to the Embassy staff
 Arrangements for collaborative research projects between the United States and foreign scientists
 General promotion of better understanding between the United States and foreign science

Notes and references

See also 
 Ambassador
 Attaché

Diplomats by role
Science occupations
Attaché